Pierre Duchesne (born August 27, 1964) is a Canadian radio and television journalist and politician from Quebec. He was a member of the National Assembly of Quebec for the riding of Borduas from 2012 to 2014, first elected in the 2012 election.

Biography
Born in Jonquière, Quebec, Duchesne obtained a bachelor's degree in political science from Université Laval in 1986 and a certificate in journalism in 1988.

Career in journalism
Duchesne was a radio and television journalist for the Société Radio-Canada from 1990 to 2012. He was radio journalist (1990-1996) and reporter (1996-2001) for the Première Chaîne, reporter (2001-2004) and Investigative journalist (2004-2005) for Radio-Canada television, Parliamentary correspondent in Québec (2005-2012) and Political analyst for Radio-Canada television in Québec (2010-2012).

Politics
After retiring from journalism, he entered politics and he was elected member of the National Assembly of Quebec for the riding of Borduas in the September 4, 2012 general election. On September 19, 2012 he was appointed the Minister of Higher Education, Research, Science and Technology .
He was defeated in the election of April 7, 2014 by Simon Jolin-Barrette of the CAQ party.

On August 12, 2015 he was named Pierre-Karl Péladeau's chief of cabinet.

Professional awards
 1998: Radio-Canada French-language radio award for best news story
 1998: Grand prize for radio awarded by the Communauté des radios publiques de langue française (France-Belgium-Switzerland-Canada)
 1998: John Humphrey journalism award, French Canadian branch of Amnesty International
 1999: John Humphrey journalism award, French Canadian branch of Amnesty International
 2001: Joint recipient of the Radio-Canada French-language radio award for best news story
 2002: Recipient of the Michener-Deacon Fellowship
 2005: Richard-Arès prize of L’Action nationale magazine

Books
Pierre Duchesne was selected by Société Radio-Canada to write an unauthorized biography of former Prime minister Jacques Parizeau. The work was published in three volumes between 2001 and 2004:
2001: Jacques Parizeau, vol. 1 : Le Croisé, 1930-1970, Québec Amérique, Montréal, 623 p., 
2002: Jacques Parizeau, vol. 2 : Le Baron, 1970-1985, Québec Amérique, Montréal, 535 p., 
2004: Jacques Parizeau, vol. 3 : Le Régent, 1985-1995, Québec Amérique, Montréal, 601 p.,

References

1964 births
Living people
Canadian radio journalists
Canadian television journalists
Journalists from Quebec
Parti Québécois MNAs
Politicians from Saguenay, Quebec
Members of the Executive Council of Quebec
Université Laval alumni
21st-century Canadian politicians